The Kakwa people are a Nilotic ethnic group and part of the Karo people found in north-western Uganda, south-western South Sudan, and north-eastern Democratic Republic of the Congo, particularly to the west of the White Nile river.

Demography 
The Kakwa people are a small minority but a part of the larger Karo people, an intermarried group that also includes the Bari, Pojulu, Mundari, Kuku, Nyepo, and Nyangwara. Their language, Kutuk na Kakwa, is an Eastern Nilotic language.

The major cities of the Kakwa people are the city of Yei and Morobo County (South Sudan), Koboko District (Uganda), and Imgbokolo and Aba (Democratic Republic of the Congo). The Kakwa people sometimes refer to themselves as "Kakwa Saliya Musala", translated directly as "kakwa three cooking stones" a phrase they commonly use to denote their 'oneness' in spite of being politically dispersed among three countries.

History
According to the Kakwa oral tradition, they migrated out of East Africa (Nubian region) from the city of Kawa in between the third and fourth cataracts of the Nile. First into South Sudan, and from there southwards into Uganda and the Democratic Republic of the Congo. Some of the Kakwa who bordered Uganda, converted to Islam, accepting the Maliki school of Sunni theology in the medieval era. They were annexed into the Equatoria region claimed by the Egyptian Islamic ruler Khedive Ismail (Isma'il Pasha) by his descendant Tewfik Pasha in 1889. As the British colonial empire expanded into East Africa and Egypt, the region with Kakwa people became a part of the Uganda Protectorate.

The Kakwa people rose to international prominence when General Idi Amin, of Kakwa ancestry, assumed the power in Uganda through a military coup. He filled important military and civil positions in his administration with his ethnic group, and Nubians. He arrested and killed officials from other ethnic groups such as the Acholi and Lango people, whom he doubted. Idi Amin also supplied arms and financed the Sudanese Kakwa people in the first civil war of Sudan. The Kakwa officials in Idi Amin regime were later accused of many humanitarian crimes. After Amin was deposed in 1979, many Kakwa people were killed in revenge killings, causing others to leave the area and fled to Sudan. However, they have now returned to their native areas in the West Nile region of northern Uganda.

Ethnic violence

For most of the South Sudanese Civil War, the fighting was focused in the Greater Upper Nile region. After the clashes in Juba in 2016, the fighting largely shifted to the previously safe haven of Equatoria, where the bulk of SPLM-IO forces went for shelter. Accounts point to both sides targeting civilians on ethnic lines between the Dinka and the dozens of ethnic groups among the Equatorians who are historically in conflict with the Dinka, such as the Karo, who include the Bari. Witnesses report Dinka soldiers threatening villagers that they will kill all Kakwa people for their alleged support to Machar and killing Pojulu people while sparing those who they find can speak Dinka. A UN investigation said rape was being used a tool of ethnic cleansing and Adama Dieng, the U.N.'s Special Adviser on the Prevention of Genocide, warned of genocide after visiting areas of fighting in Yei.

Lifestyle
The traditional Kakwa livelihood has been based on cultivating corn, millet, cassava, fishing and cattle. The traditional villages of Kakwa are linked by their lineage, with males forming councils of elders. Polygyny is accepted and practised, while Christian and Islamic traditions form part of the Kakwa people’s [cultural value systems and living style].

Countries where Kakwa are located 

 South Sudan
 Uganda
 Democratic republic of Congo

Cultural food consumed by the Kakwa people 

 Maize
 Casava
 Sorghum
 Millet
 Beans
 Cowpeas
 Simsim
 Groundnuts
 Palm oil
 yarms
 Sweet potatoes

See also 
Equatorians-Dinka fighting

References

Ethnic groups in Uganda
Ethnic groups in South Sudan
Ethnic groups in the Democratic Republic of the Congo